Robert C. "Bobby" Crespino (January 11, 1938 – July 29, 2013) was an American football tight end who played in the National Football League (NFL) for the Cleveland Browns and New York Giants. Born in Duncan, Mississippi, he played college football at the University of Mississippi and was drafted in the first round (tenth overall) of the 1961 NFL Draft. Crespino was also selected in the sixth round of the 1961 AFL Draft by the Oakland Raiders. He was the father of political historian, Joseph Crespino.  Crespino died on July 29, 2013, in Atlanta, Georgia following a long undisclosed illness.

References

1938 births
2013 deaths
American football tight ends
Cleveland Browns players
New York Giants players
Ole Miss Rebels football players
People from Bolivar County, Mississippi
Players of American football from Mississippi